"Best Day of My Life" is a song by American pop rock band American Authors, released on March 19, 2013, by Mercury Records and Island Records as the 
lead single from their third extended play, American Authors (2013), and the second single from their debut studio album, Oh, What a Life (2014). The song was written by band members Zac Barnett, Dave Rublin, Matt Sanchez, and James Adam Shelley, along with producers Aaron Accetta and Shep Goodman.

Composition 
The song is written in D major with a tempo of 96 beats per minute.

Music and lyrics 
Dave Rublin spoke in a podcast of Songfacts where he disclosed that the song was being written when the Sandy Hook Elementary School shooting happened in 2012. They were inspired to write the song to "make people happy and make people feel positive, because that's something that was missing from rock and from songwriting, just something so simplistic that can be an earworm, that can carry people."

Zac Barnett told an interviewer for Blueprint Magazine, "Recently we have been experimenting with a lot of different instruments including banjo, mandolin and various percussion toys. Africa-influenced rhythms have been taking more of a prominent role in our songs which has then opened up our ideas on melodies. We're always open to trying new things and we get very excited to learn new instruments and experiment with new sounds. ... "Best Day of My Life" was an idea that James and I had been messing around with. We had the pre-chorus and chorus but once we showed the idea to the rest of the guys they came in and restructured the verses and added the stuttered "life" chorus. Looking back on it, the song changed a lot from the initial idea but that's what I love so much about it. I'll always remember that song being started on acoustic guitars in my tiny Bushwick bedroom, but all of us together as a band really took the song to a completely different place."

Barnett mentions "the stuttered 'life' chorus"—as in "the best day of my li-i-i-i-ife"; the "stuttering" also occurs in a recurrent "whoa-oh-oh-oh-oh-oh-oh"—by which he refers to a lyrical tradition of stuttering in rock music, popularized by Buddy Holly, David Bowie ("Ch-Ch-Changes"), Elton John, and others.

Bill Lamb, writing for About.com, praised the song's "opening banjo lick" as "a perfect first hook," its "irrepressibly upbeat lyrics," and "a blend of key elements from across a wide range of current successful pop music." He added, "The bass drum heavy backing percussion sounds a little like Imagine Dragons, and backed by a pop-punk style "Whoa Oh" chorus, "Best Day of My Life" takes some of the most distinctive elements of a variety of current pop hit genres and blends them into something new."

The song also utilizes the millennial whoop.

Packaging
The single art for the "Best Day of My Life" single features a photograph of the skyline of Midtown Manhattan, with the Empire State Building in the center of the shot, from Brooklyn looking north. The photograph is overwritten by the American Authors logo on the majority of the photograph and the words "American Authors", with "Best Day of My Life" written underneath it.

Commercial performance
The song received significant airplay on the radio for it to debut at No. 49 in the Hot Rock Songs and No. 40 in the Adult Top 40 for charts dated October 5, 2013. It began climbing the various rock charts and became a crossover hit on both alternative rock and top 40 stations, becoming big hits on those formats and peaking at No. 2, No. 18 and No. 4 on the Hot Rock Songs, Alternative Songs, and Mainstream Top 40 charts, and was a sleeper hit. 

It debuted on the Billboard Hot 100 at No. 93 for the chart dated November 30, 2013, and eventually peaked at No. 11 on the charts dated April 19 and May 10, 2014. By March, 2014, it had reached No. 1 on the Adult Top 40. The song reached its first million sales mark in the United States in March 2014, and its second million in August 2014. The song was certified 2× Platinum on July 16, 2014, by the Recording Industry Association of America (RIAA). The song was ranked number one on Billboards chart of Adult Pop Songs for 2014. To date, it remains the only single by the band to break the top 40 in the United States.

Usage in media

Commercials
In media, the song has been featured in television advertisements for: retail home improvement store Lowe's in the United States, which were aired during the Super Bowl, automotive manufacturer Hyundai in the United Kingdom and France, an alcohol retailer in Australia and communications service provider Telecom New Zealand in New Zealand. The song is used in advertisements for Petron, Datsun Go, Lay's, Center Parcs and Graton Casinos. The song was used in commercials for Best Western hotels. The song was used in a Ford sales event commercial and is used by Alaska Communications in adverts.

Film
It appears in the movie trailer for the films Delivery Man, Yes Day, The Secret Life of Walter Mitty in addition to the TV spots for St. Vincent. A portion of "Best Day of My Life" can also be heard in the animated film Alpha and Omega. Portions of the song are played throughout the 2014 film "Moms Night Out" and in the 2015 film, Paul Blart: Mall Cop 2. The song was used in the 2015 film Top Cat Begins, and also plays during the credits. It was also used in the US version of the adult animated film Bad Cat.

Television
The song has also been used in the Vampire Diaries episode "Total Eclipse of the Heart". The song was covered by Blaine Anderson (Darren Criss) and Sam Evans (Chord Overstreet) in the 2014 Glee episode "New New York". American Authors performed the song while in Human Centipede position on season four premiere of The Eric Andre Show. The BBC used the track during their closing montage for their 2016 United States presidential election coverage.

Sports
The song was heard in the opening sequence for ESPN's coverage of the 2013 and 2014 World Series of Poker as well as during their coverage of the 2013 Little League World Series. NHL on NBC used this song as a theme song for the 2014 Stanley Cup Playoffs. The Oklahoma City Thunder (NBA) used the song in the 2014–15 pregame activities.

Video games
"Best Day of My Life" was part of the FIFA 14 soundtrack before being removed shortly after the game's release. "Best Day of My Life" also appeared as a playable track for the video game Guitar Hero Live. "Best Day of My Life" also appeared as a soundtrack in Konami video game Pro Evolution Soccer 2015 as the opening track.

Live
"Best Day of My Life", was the official song of the 2017 Maltese Labour Party's General Election Campaign, entitled "L-aqwa żmien ta' pajjiżna." (The Best time for our country). "Best Day of My Life" was played at the conclusion of the 2015 Miss America pageant, during Kira Kazantsev's crowning moment. The song was used as a fanfare to welcome the Singapore Armed Forces Parachute Team (better known as the Red Lions) during the National Day Celebrations of 2014 in Singapore.

Music video
The music video was released on October 18, 2013, via YouTube. The video was filmed in Brooklyn, New York. It depicts a man engaging in various activities with a large furry monster, such as drinking in a bar called Sweet & Vicious in Nolita, playing basketball, looking at the Brooklyn Bridge, getting matching tattoos, visiting a strip club, and going to a playground. At the end of the video, it is implied that the monster is his imaginary friend, but then the puzzled bartender finds a photo of the two.

Zac Barnett, in an interview with the Jim & Kim Morning Show (Fresh 102.7 FM, New York City, New York), explained that the video starts in Nolita and ends up in Brooklyn, and the journey of the man and his monster pal is the focus of the video. That journey is interweaved with shots of the band playing and singing as they also stroll through New York. "We started in Manhattan and walked across the bridge to the party which was down in Dumbo. What it was, we were kind of trying to do a reverse Where the Wild Things Are type thing. You know, instead of a human going into a monster dream world, what would it be like if a monster came into our world and experienced New York City and Brooklyn and all of these things. And playing off of that, it was kind of like an alter ego of a dude and these two, together, just showing each other the best days of their lives."

Common Sense Media reviewed the video for parents: "There's nothing iffy to worry about in the song's upbeat, clean lyrics about having a positive outlook on life and never giving up, but the official music video shows a man and his furry monster friend drinking in a bar, going to a strip club, and getting tattoos. Kids will be more entertained by the adorable dog-version music video for "Best Day of My Life", which shows one lucky bulldog's adoption day in an effort to promote pet adoption."

Track listing

Personnel
Adapted from Oh, What a Life liner notes.

American Authors
Zac Barnett – lead vocals, guitar
James Adam Shelley – banjo
Dave Rublin – bass
Matt Sanchez – drums

Technical personnel
Aaron Accetta – production
Michael Goodman – production

Charts

Weekly charts

Year-end charts

Decade-end charts

All-time charts

Certifications

Release history

References

External links

2013 songs
2013 singles
American Authors songs
Mercury Records singles
Songs written by Shep Goodman
Songs written by Aaron Accetta
Song recordings produced by Aaron Accetta